Udhowali (Urdu : ادھووالی) is a village located in Tehsil Nowshera Virkan District Gujranwala, Punjab, Pakistan. It lies on the Nokhar-Alipur road, 36 km west from Gujranwala. Its a Union Council of Nowshera Virkan.

History
Udhowali is a historical village like Badoki Saikhwan. There are many modern buildings as well as Mughal Empire buildings founded. The village was the home of Muslims and Sikhs before Partition Of India now the main cast of living people there is gujjar.

Education
The education system of Village is very impressive. There is a College, High School, primary Schools and other Private sector spreading Education in whole area. There are also some Madaras in village, to educate the Islamic learnings.

College
 Govt. Degree College Udhowali

Schools
 Govt. High School Udhowali
 Govt Primary School Udhowalui
 Govt. Girls Primary School Udhowali
 Concise Public Institution Udhowali
Madaras
 Jamia Noumania Udhowali

See also
 Nowshera Virkan
 Badoki Saikhwan
 Gujranwala

References 

Villages in Gujranwala District